The 2011 USL Premier Development League season was the 17th season of the PDL. The regular season began on April 29, 2011, when the Los Angeles Blues 23 played Fresno Fuego, and ended on July 24. The playoffs began on Tuesday, July 26 and concluded with the PDL Championship Game on August 6. As in previous years, the PDL Championship Game was broadcast live on Fox Soccer Channel in the United States, with commentary by Steve Bell and Keith Tabatznik.

The Kitsap Pumas ended the season as national champions, beating Laredo Heat 1-0 in the 2011 PDL Championship game. The playoffs were held at the home of the Pumas in Bremerton, Washington.

Fresno Fuego had the best regular-season record, posting an unbeaten 13-0-3 record. Fresno midfielder Milton Blanco was named League MVP, after leading the league in points (38) and assists (14) and helping his team to the Southwest Division title. Two Michigan Bucks players - Stewart Givens and Mitch Hildebrandt - were given end-of-season awards as Defender of the Year and Goalkeeper of the Year respectively, while their coach Gary Parsons was named Coach of the Year. Jake Keegan of the Westchester Flames was named Rookie of the Year after tallying 16 goals in 16 games to take the league goal-scoring crown. Keegan accounted for 64 percent of Westchester’s goals in 2011 and also finished third in the league in points with 34.

Changes from 2010

Name changes 
 Hampton Roads Piranhas rebranded as Virginia Beach Piranhas
 Los Angeles Azul Legends rebranded as Los Angeles Misioneros
 Newark Ironbound Express rebranded as Jersey Express

New franchise 
Ten franchises were announced as joining the league this year:

Folding/moving 
Thirteen teams were announced as leaving the league prior to the beginning of the season:
Albany BWP Highlanders - Schenectady, New York
Atlanta Blackhawks - Alpharetta, Georgia
Cleveland Internationals - Medina, Ohio
Dayton Dutch Lions - Bellbrook, Ohio - left to join USL Pro
DFW Tornados - Frisco, Texas
Hollywood United Hitmen - Los Angeles, California - left to join National Premier Soccer League
Houston Leones - Richmond, Texas
Kalamazoo Outrage - Kalamazoo, Michigan
Lancaster Rattlers - Lancaster, California - left to join National Premier Soccer League
Rio Grande Valley Bravos - Brownsville, Texas - left to join Southern Premier Soccer League, changed name to RGV Ocelots
Rochester Thunder - Rochester, Minnesota
Spokane Spiders - Spokane, Washington
Yakima Reds - Yakima, Washington

Standings

Note: The first tie-breaker in PDL standings is head-to-head results between teams tied on points, which is why some teams with inferior goal differences finish ahead in the standings.

Central Conference

Great Lakes Division

Heartland Division

Eastern Conference

Mid Atlantic Division

Northeast Division

South Atlantic Division

Southern Conference

Mid South Division

Southeast Division

Western Conference

Northwest Division

Southwest Division

League post-season tournament

Division matches for qualification

Bracket

Conference Quarterfinals

Conference semifinals

Conference finals

PDL Semifinals

PDL Final

Award Winners and Finalists
MVP: Milton Blanco (FRE) (winner), Mitch Hildebrandt (MIC), Chandler Hoffman (OCB)
Rookie of the Year: Albert Edward (RCR), Brian Holt (REA), Jake Keegan (WES) (winner)
Defender of the Year: Dillon Barna (VCF), Stewart Givens (MIC) (winner), Wilson Neto (TBC)
Goalkeeper of the Year: Mitch Hildebrandt (MIC)
Coach of the Year: Tony Colistro (TBC), Pete Fewing (KIT), Gary Parsons (MIC) (winner)

All-League and All-Conference teams

Eastern Conference
F: Hakan Ilhan (CAR), Jake Keegan (WES)*, Dominick Sarle (LIR)
M: Keishen Bean (BER), Jason Massie (POR), Stephen Okai (REA)
D: Matthew Baker (REA), Brian Fekete (POR), Shaun Foster (JER), Kyle Manscuk (OTT)
G: Brian Holt (REA)

Central Conference
F: Adam Mena (IND), Branden Stelmak (CIN), Brandon Swartzendruber (TBC)
M: Tom Catalano (MIC), Albert Edward (RCR), John Sosa (DMM)*
D: Kevin Cope (CHI), Stewart Givens (MIC)*, Jonathan Raj (CHI), Wilson Neto (TBC)*
G: Mitch Hildebrandt (MIC)*

Southern Conference
F: Moses Aduny (MIS), Esteban Bayona (LAR), Achille Campion (BRC)
M: Michael Azira (MIS), Enrique Cervantes (EPP), Jonathan Mendoza (CFK)*
D: Carlos Ordaz (LAR), Guilherme Reis (BRD), Daniel Sackman (CFK), Hugo Samano Contreras (EPP)
G: Keneil Baker (CFK)

Western Conference
F: Milton Blanco (FRE)*, Chandler Hoffman (OCB)*, Brent Richards (POR)
M: Danny Barrera (VCF)*, Nikolas Besagno (KIT), Jose Cuevas (FRE)
D: Dillon Barna (VCF)*, Fernando De Alba (LAB), Ryan Kawulok (POR), Daniel Scott (KIT)*
G. Bryan Meredith (KIT)

* denotes All-League player

See also
2011 USL Pro season
2011 W-League Season

References

2011
4